Creepers is an upcoming American horror film directed by Marc Klasfeld and written by Stephen Susco. It is Klasfeld's feature directorial debut and based on David Morrell's novel of the same name.

Cast
Jake Manley as Rick
Adeline Rudolph as Diane
Francesca Reale as Cora
Laurence O'Fuarain as Balenger
Nicholas Hamilton as Tod
Javier Botet as Pale Creature
Kai Caster as JD
Shane Paul McGhie as Vernon

Production
On July 11, 2022, it was announced that Lionsgate and Suretone Pictures would co-finance the film, with Klasfeld serving as director.

On July 29, 2022, it was announced that Manley, Rudolph, Reale, O’Fuarain, Hamilton, Botet, Caster and Skylan Brooks were cast in the film.

In August 2022, it was announced that McGhie replaced Brooks and that filming occurred in Bulgaria.

References

External links
 

Upcoming directorial debut films
Lionsgate films
Films based on American horror novels
Films shot in Bulgaria
Upcoming films